Lawrence J. Zerner (born September 8, 1963) is an American lawyer and actor who appeared in the 1982 horror film Friday the 13th Part III as Shelly Finkelstein, the original owner of the infamous hockey mask which became Jason Voorhees's trademark. He later reprised the role in the 2017 video game Friday the 13th: The Game.

Other film roles include the 1984 movie Hadley's Rebellion. He made a guest appearance on the television series Fame. Zerner was born in Los Angeles, California. He was discovered on a street corner in Westwood, Los Angeles, California, handing out passes to a screening of The Road Warrior.

After quitting acting in 1987 Zerner became an entertainment lawyer in Hollywood. In 2005, Larry represented Jeff Bergquist in a copyright infringement lawsuit against Daniel Knauf and HBO over the television series Carnivàle. Also in 2005, Zerner represented George Lutz in a lawsuit against the makers of the remake of The Amityville Horror.

Larry was a contestant on the ABC prime time version of Who Wants to Be a Millionaire but did not make it to the "hot seat" with Regis Philbin.

On February 9, 2007, Larry was the $250,000 winner of the Last Man Standing edition of 1 vs. 100, defeating, among others, Ken Jennings, Annie Duke, Brad Rutter, Kevin Olmstead and Nancy Christy. In 2009, he appeared on Doug Benson's comedy podcast I Love Movies (now known as Doug Loves Movies) where he donated $1,800 to the Los Angeles Food Bank.

Zerner returned to acting in 2013 with Knights of Badassdom and has appeared in numerous films since, including one video game. He has played a character with the name Shelly in different franchises on four occasions.

Filmography

References

External links

Larry Zerner's Official Site
Video Clip of Larry Zerner on 1 vs. 100

1963 births
American male film actors
Lawyers from Los Angeles
Living people
Male actors from Los Angeles